Atomosia is a genus of robber flies in the family Asilidae. There are at least 60 described species in Atomosia.

Species
These 61 species belong to the genus Atomosia:

 Atomosia affinis Macquart, 1850 c g
 Atomosia anacaona Scarbrough & Perez-Gelabert, 2006 c g
 Atomosia andrenoides Bromley, 1934 c g
 Atomosia anonyma Williston, 1901 c g
 Atomosia appendiculata Macquart, 1846 c g
 Atomosia argyrophora Schiner, 1868 c g
 Atomosia arkansensis Barnes, 2008 c g b
 Atomosia armata Hermann, 1912 c g
 Atomosia barbiellinii Curran, 1935 c g
 Atomosia beckeri Jaennicke, 1867 c g
 Atomosia bequaerti Bromley, 1934 c g
 Atomosia bigoti Bellardi, 1861 c g
 Atomosia brevicornis Macquart, 1838 c g
 Atomosia cerverai Bromley, 1929 c g
 Atomosia ciguaya Scarbrough & Perez-Gelabert, 2006 c g
 Atomosia coxalis Curran, 1930 c g
 Atomosia cyanescens Rondani, 1848 c g
 Atomosia danforthi Curran, 1935 c g
 Atomosia echemon (Walker, 1849) i
 Atomosia fredericom Carrera, 1952 c g
 Atomosia frontalis Curran, 1930 c g
 Atomosia geniculata (Wiedemann, 1821) c g
 Atomosia glabrata Say i c g b
 Atomosia hondurana James, 1953 c g
 Atomosia jagua Scarbrough & Perez-Gelabert, 2006 c g
 Atomosia jimagua Scarbrough & Perez-Gelabert, 2006 c g
 Atomosia limbata (Macquart, 1834) c g
 Atomosia limbiventris Thomson, 1869 c g
 Atomosia lineata Curran, 1930 c g
 Atomosia macquarti Bellardi, 1861 c g
 Atomosia maestrae Bromley, 1929 c g
 Atomosia melanopogon Hermann, 1912 i c g b
 Atomosia metallescens Hermann, 1912 c g
 Atomosia metallica Bromley, 1929 c g
 Atomosia modesta (Philippi, 1865) c g
 Atomosia mucida Osten Sacken, 1887 i c g b
 Atomosia mucidoides Bromley, 1951 i
 Atomosia nigroaenea Walker, 1851 c g
 Atomosia nuda Hermann, 1912 c g
 Atomosia panamensis Curran, 1930 c g
 Atomosia parva (Bigot, 1857) c g
 Atomosia pilipes Thomson, 1869 c g
 Atomosia pubescens Bromley, 1929 c g
 Atomosia puella (Wiedemann, 1828) i c g b
 Atomosia punctifera Hermann, 1912 i c g
 Atomosia pusilla Macquart, 1838 i c g
 Atomosia rica Curran, 1935 c g
 Atomosia rosalesi Carrera & Machado-Allison, 1963 c g
 Atomosia rufipes Macquart, 1847 i c g b
 Atomosia sayii Johnson, 1903 i c g b
 Atomosia scoriacea (Wiedemann, 1828) c g
 Atomosia selene Curran, 1935 c g
 Atomosia sericans Walker, 1860 c g
 Atomosia setosa Hermann, 1912 c g
 Atomosia similis Bigot, 1856 c g
 Atomosia tenus Curran, 1930 c g
 Atomosia tibialis Macquart, 1846 c g
 Atomosia unicolor Macquart, 1838 c g
 Atomosia venustula Lynch Arribalzaga, 1880 c g
 Atomosia xanthopus (Wiedemann, 1828) c g
 Atomosia yurabia Scarbrough & Perez-Gelabert, 2006 c g

Data sources: i = ITIS, c = Catalogue of Life, g = GBIF, b = Bugguide.net

References

Further reading

External links

 

 
Asilidae genera
Articles created by Qbugbot